The Georgian Parliament Building in Kutaisi was constructed from 2011 to 2012 in Kutaisi, traditionally the second most important city of Georgia,  west of Tbilisi, the nation's capital, to house the Parliament of Georgia. Built by the architecture firm CMD Ingenieros, the building was inaugurated on 26 May 2012 and, according to the respective constitutional clause, became the main seat of the newly elected Parliament in October 2012 until the legislature moved back to Tbilisi in January 2019.

It was constructed on the initiative of then-President of Georgia Mikheil Saakashvili on the site of a memorial to Soviet soldiers of World War II; the monument was demolished with explosives to free space for the construction in December 2009, accidentally killing two people, a mother and a daughter. The government, during the building's construction, promoted it as a symbol of Georgia's bright, democratic future. Its location in Kutaisi was touted as a boost for the regional economy there as well as a way to knit the country closer together. Critics state that the building is a waste of money, and that having Parliament in Kutaisi, while the rest of the government remains in Tbilisi, is inefficient.     

After Saakashvili's term in office expired, the new government of the Georgian Dream coalition decided to move all parliamentary activities back to Tbilisi. The constitutional amendment passed in 2017 entered into force in December 2018, containing no reference to Kutaisi as the seat of the Parliament, meaning that the Parliament fully returned to the capital in January 2019. The building in Kutaisi is set to pass into possession of the Ministry of Internal Affairs of Georgia.

References

Parliament 2012
Buildings and structures in Kutaisi
Legislative buildings in Europe
Former seats of national legislatures
Government buildings completed in 2012
2012 establishments in Georgia (country)